John Curtis was an English landscape painter.

Career 
John Curtis was a pupil of William Marlow at Twickenham. In 1790 he exhibited at the Royal Academy A View of Netley Abbey, and was an occasional exhibitor in the following years. In 1797 he departed from his usual style, exhibiting a picture of the Indefatigable and Amazon frigates under Sir Edward Pellew engaging Les Droits de l'Homme, a French seventy-four. Nothing is known of his subsequent career. Some of his views were engraved.

References

Sources 
 Cust, L. H.; Lambert, R. J. (2004). "Curtis, John (fl. 1790–1797), landscape painter". Oxford Dictionary of National Biography. Oxford University Press. Retrieved 16 September 2022.
 Graves, Algernon (1884). A Dictionary of Artists Who Have Exhibited Works in the Principal London Exhibitions of Oil Paintings From 1760 to 1880. London: George Bell and Sons. p. 59. 
 Oliver, Valerie Cassel, ed. (2011). "Curtis, John". Benezit Dictionary of Artists. Oxford University Press. Retrieved 16 September 2022.
 Redgrave, Samuel (1878). "Curtis, John". A Dictionary of Artists of the English School. New ed. London: George Bell and Sons. p. 110.
 "John Curtis". The British Museum. Retrieved 16 September 2022.

Attribution:

18th-century English painters
English landscape painters
18th-century births